United Nations Security Council Resolution 2139 was passed by a unanimous vote of the Council on February 22, 2014, and calls on all parties in the Syrian Civil War to permit free access to humanitarian aid.

On July 14, 2014, it was supplemented by United Nations Security Council Resolution 2165, allowing direct humanitarian access to four border crossings not controlled by the Syrian government.

References

External links
Text of the Resolution at undocs.org

United Nations Security Council resolutions concerning Syria
2014 United Nations Security Council resolutions
2014 in Syria
February 2014 events